Narek Baveyan  (born on April 19, 1983), is an Armenian singer, songwriter and actor. He is known for his role as Norik on Domino TV-series. He was a guest of "White corner" on February 3, 2015 and a guest of "Barter" on October 5, 2014. He played in Bridge of Love musical (2014–2015).

Filmography

Discography

Singles
 2008 - "Mi togh indz"
 2009 - "Hasnelu em" (featuring Aratta)
 2009 - "Ko hogin"
 2011 - "Khelagar ser" (16+)
 2011 - "Yekel em paghtsnem"
 2011 - "Verjin angam"
 2012 - "Ur gnats"
 2014 - "Без Тебя" (Without you, Russian, featuring Gevorg Barsamyan)
 2014 - "Mer metsere"
 2014 - "Srtis Uzatze" 
 2015 - "Arevik"
 2016 - "Hasel em"

External links

References

1988 births
Living people
Armenian songwriters
Armenian male film actors
21st-century Armenian male singers
21st-century Armenian male actors